A national outline plan (Tokhnit Mit'ar Artzit, abbr. תמ"א, Tama) refers to a zoning and development statutory plan in a specific field on a national level in Israel. A national outline plan is meant to affect the entire country and influences planning on the regional and local levels. In general, each national plan is augmented by more local plans that discuss its implementation in more detail. National outline plans are drafted by the National Planning and Construction Committee or the National Infrastructure Committee, and approved by the government of Israel.

The first national outline plan, created by architect Aryeh Sharon, was approved in 1951, and dealt with settling the Negev and Galilee regions. However, this plan was never implemented. The first national plan to be put to practical use was National Outline Plan 3, approved in 1976, dealing with road infrastructure in the country.

List of current national outline plans

Future
As of 2013, there is a plan to merge all National Outline Plans, except Plan 35, to one master plan.

References

External links
 Current list of national outline plans at the Ministry of the Interior website
 Current list of national outline plans at the Israel Land Administration website

Urban planning in Israel